This is a list of the main career statistics of French professional tennis player Lucas Pouille. All statistics are according to the ATP World Tour and ITF websites.

Performance timelines

Singles
Current through the 2022 Open 13.

Doubles

ATP Tour career finals

Singles: 9 (5 titles, 4 runner-ups)

ATP Challenger and Futures finals

Singles: 11 (5 titles, 6 runner-ups)

Doubles: 3 (3 runners-up)

Other finals

Team competitions finals: 2 (1 title, 1 runner-up)

Wins over top 10 players

Singles

Doubles

Notes

References

External links

 
 
 

Pouille, Lucas